Caste is an upcoming American drama film written and directed by Ava DuVernay. It is based upon Caste: The Origins of Our Discontents by Isabel Wilkerson. It stars Aunjanue Ellis, Niecy Nash-Betts, Jon Bernthal, Vera Farmiga, Jasmine Cephas Jones, Nick Offerman and Connie Nielsen.

Cast
 Aunjanue Ellis
 Niecy Nash-Betts
 Jon Bernthal
 Vera Farmiga
 Jasmine Cephas Jones
 Nick Offerman
 Connie Nielsen
 Audra McDonald
 Myles Frost
 Blair Underwood
 Victoria Pedretti
 Isha Blaaker
 Leonardo Nam 
 Donna Mills
 Emily Yancy 
 Finn Wittrock
 Mieke Schymura

Production
In October 2020, it was announced Ava DuVernay would direct, write, and produce a film adaption of Caste: The Origins of Our Discontents for Netflix. In January 2023, Aunjanue Ellis, Niecy Nash-Betts, Jon Bernthal, Vera Farmiga, Jasmine Cephas Jones, Nick Offerman and Connie Nielsen joined the cast of the film, with Netflix no longer attached. In February 2023, Audra McDonald, Myles Frost, Blair Underwood, Victoria Pedretti, Isha Blaaker, Finn Wittrock, Leonardo Nam and Donna Mills joined the cast of the film.

Principal photography began in December 2022.

References

External links

Upcoming films
American drama films
Films directed by Ava DuVernay